Tenryū may refer to:

Tenryū, Shizuoka, a city
Tenryū, Nagano, a village
Tenryū River
Tenryū-ji, a temple
 , several ships

People with the name
Tenryū Saburō (Saburo Wakuta, 1903-1989), Japanese sumo wrestler and martial arts fighter
Genichiro Tenryu (Genichiro Shimada, born 1950), Japanese sumo wrestler and wrestler promoter